The Davidson–Childs House is a historic residence in Hood River, Oregon, United States.

The house was listed on the National Register of Historic Places in 1989.

See also

National Register of Historic Places listings in Hood River County, Oregon

References

External links

1904 establishments in Oregon
Houses completed in 1904
Houses in Hood River County, Oregon
Houses on the National Register of Historic Places in Oregon
National Register of Historic Places in Hood River County, Oregon
Stick-Eastlake architecture in Oregon